Tarna may refer to:

People
 Nicu Țărnă (born 1977), Moldovan musician, actor, songwriter, showman and TV presenter

Places
 Tarna, Kardzhali Province, Bulgaria
 Tarna (Caso), Spain
 Tarna Mare, Romania
 , Hungary

Other
 Tarna Feir, character in the Wheel of Time series
 Tarna, the main city in Quest_for_Glory_III:_Wages_of_War